The importance of Tamil loanwords in Biblical Hebrew is that linguistically these words are the earliest attestation of the Tamil language.  These words were incorporated into the writing of the Hebrew Bible starting before 500 BCE. Although a number of authors have identified many biblical and post-biblical words of Tamil, Old Tamil, or Dravidian origin, a number of them have competing etymologies and some Tamil derivations are considered controversial.

Origins

The incorporation of Tamil loanwords into the Hebrew language originally came about through the interactions of West Asian and South Indian merchants. The mainstream view is that the beginnings of trade between the Mediterranean region and South India can be traced back to 500 BCE when the word , which was derived from the Proto-South Dravidian *cinki-ver (for "ginger"), first appeared in the Greek language.  This indicates South India possibly having been involved in trade with the Mediterranean diaspora centuries earlier.  There is some evidence that trade between India and the peoples inhabiting the Mediterranean regions may have been well established by 1500 BCE.

Due to its native speakers' location—in the critical path of trade between Egypt, Mesopotamia, and India—ancient Hebrew lexicon contains both cultural words that are common to many languages in the general area and loanwords from various other languages including Ancient Greek.  Some of these loan words are present in the earliest transcripts of the Bible.  By the mid-nineteenth century, Christian missionaries trained in Biblical Hebrew noticed that there were words of Indian origin in the Bible, including from the Tamil language. Some of the loan words were borrowed directly from Tamil or Old Tamil into Biblical Hebrew.  Others were borrowed via the Akkadian, Aramaic, Greek, Persian, and South Arabian languages.  The period of these lexiconic  borrowings range from 1000 BCE to 500 BCE.  The dating of this borrowing depends on the acceptable ranges of dates for the compilation and redaction of the Books of Kings.

Linguistic influences
Most of the borrowed words had to do with items of trade that were unique to South India but which lacked native names in Hebrew.  According to linguists such as Chaim Rabin and Abraham Mariaselvam, the Tamil linguistic impact in Hebrew goes beyond just loan words.  The contact also influenced the poetic traditions and styles such as those found in the Song of Songs, which according to Rabin and Mariaselvam shows the influence of Cankam anthologies.

Linguistically, the importance of Tamil loanwords in Hebrew is that it is the earliest attestation of Tamil language  and an early attestation in the Dravidian languages.  This was before Tamil (using the Tamil Brahmi script and dated variously from 600 BCE to 200 BCE), was widely written down. Although a number of authors have identified many Biblical and post-Biblical words of Tamil, Old Tamil, or Dravidian origin, a number of them have competing etymologies and some Tamil derivations are today considered controversial. There is also a class of words that were borrowed ultimately from Indo-Aryan languages spoken in North India but via Tamil.

Post-Biblical Hebrew

See also
 Indian maritime history
 Indus–Mesopotamia relations
 Meluhha trade with Sumer

Notes

References

Cited literature

Further reading
 Non-Semitic loanwords in the Hebrew Bible

Hebrew
Lists of loanwords
Hebrew words and phrases
Language of the Hebrew Bible